The Williams' Hospital was an almshouse in the English town of Hereford.  The hospital was founded in 1601 by Richard Williams who was an attendant of Lord Cobhans and it provided housing for six elderly men.

References
Hereford Almshouses

1601 establishments in England
Hospitals established in the 17th century
English medieval hospitals and almshouses
Almshouses in Herefordshire
Hereford